Zu Geng or Zu Gengzhi (ca. 480 – ca. 525) was a Chinese mathematician, politician, and writer. His courtesy name was Jingshuo. He was the son of the famous mathematician Zu Chongzhi. He is known principally for deriving and proving the formula for the volume of a sphere. He additionally measured the angular distance between Polaris and the celestial north pole.

See also
List of Chinese mathematicians

References

External links
 

480 births
525 deaths
5th-century Chinese mathematicians
6th-century Chinese writers
6th-century Chinese mathematicians
Ancient Chinese mathematicians
Liang dynasty politicians
Southern Qi politicians